Slieve Foy or Slieve Foye is a mountain on the Cooley Peninsula in Louth, Ireland. It overlooks Carlingford Lough and the village of Carlingford, and is sometimes called Carlingford Mountain.

Geography
Slieve Foy is one of two ridges which make up the Cooley Mountains and is separated from the rest of the range by the Windy Gap. It is an elongated mountain running northwest–southeast and includes the lesser summits known as The Foxes Rock, The Ravens Rock, The Eagles Rock, and Barnavave.

Naming
The name Sliabh Feá means "mountain of the woods". Locally the name is understood as Sliabh Fathaigh, "mountain of the giant", because its outline is said to resemble a sleeping giant. Local lore has it that the giant Finn, representing summer, stood on the mountain while fighting his rival Ruscaire, representing winter. Finn is said to have beaten Ruscaire by throwing a boulder across the lough at him, which became the Cloughmore (The Big Stone) on Slieve Martin.

The mountain also appears in the Táin Bó Cúailnge (Cattle Raid of Cooley). The army of Queen Medb (Maeve) is said to have dug a pass through the mountain, which became known as Barnavave (Bearna Mhéabha, "Maeve's gap").

Leprechauns
A local businessman began organising leprechaun-related tourist activities in the area in 1989, including a "leprechaun hunt" to find hidden ceramic figures. In 2009, with support from local councillors, the mountain was formally declared a "Designated Area of Protection for Flora, Fauna, Wild Animals and Little People" under the EU Habitats Directive.

See also

Lists of mountains in Ireland
List of Irish counties by highest point
List of mountains of the British Isles by height
List of Marilyns in the British Isles

References

Mountains and hills of County Louth
Highest points of Irish counties
Marilyns of Ireland